János Löbe (born 21 August 1995) is a German professional footballer who plays as a defender and midfielder for Mittelrheinliga club SV Eintracht Hohkeppel.

Career

Youth and college
Born in Kierspe, Germany, Löbe started his soccer career in the youth system of semi-professional club, Wuppertaler SV. He later moved to the United States to attend college at Fordham University, where he was a member of the varsity soccer team with his brother, Jannik. In 2017 he made four appearances for Canadian PDL side, K–W United, scoring three goals.

New York Red Bulls
On 11 January 2019, Löbe was drafted in the first round of the 2019 MLS SuperDraft, by the New York Red Bulls; becoming the third player from Fordham to be drafted in the club's history. He made his professional soccer debut with the New York Red Bulls II on 20 April 2019.

Miami FC
On 28 January 2020, Löbe signed for Miami FC ahead of the club's first season in the second division USL Championship. He made his debut for the team later that year against Atlanta United 2 on 30 July in a 4–3 loss.

Career statistics

References

External links

1995 births
Living people
Association football defenders
Footballers from North Rhine-Westphalia
Fordham Rams men's soccer players
German footballers
New York Red Bulls draft picks
K-W United FC players
New York Red Bulls U-23 players
New York Red Bulls II players
Miami FC players
People from Märkischer Kreis
Sportspeople from Arnsberg (region)
USL League Two players
USL Championship players
Oberliga (football) players
German expatriate footballers
German expatriate sportspeople in the United States
Expatriate soccer players in the United States